The Sachora Brahmin are a Hindu  caste found in the state of Gujarat in India. They are a sub-group of the Brahmin community.

History and origin

The community get their name from the town of Sanchore in Jalore district of Rajasthan. The Ista Devi of this community is Sati Dakshayani Mata whose temple is based at the Sanchor. The Ista Devta of this community is "Surya Narayan Bhagavan" and their three various "Swaroop" are worshiped. The first one is "Balark Prabhu" whose temple is based at "Barmer" in Rajasthan. The second one is "PingalShyamji" whose temple is based at "Planswa" in Gujarat. The third one quite not updated. This community is first time migrated in the 12th century for development of their caste & start to leaving in North Gujarat. Second time they are said to have left Rajasthan in the 15th century fleeing a Muslim invasion. Their initial settlement was Shedrasana, near Palanpur. Then they divided in groups with Balarkji, Pingalshyamji and vrudharkaji.  Palasava in Kutch District, "Gujarat" from where they dispersed to neighbouring Saurashtra. In Kutch, they were temple priests at the temple of Achleshwar Mahadeo. They are now found in the districts of Rajkot, Junagadh, Kutch, Ahmedabad, Amreli and Mehsana. The community speak the Kathiawari dialect of Gujarati. Most Sanchihar People live in Gujarat, Rajasthan, Maharashtra, Madhya Pradesh mainly.
They mainly belong to Vallabh beliefs. They worship mainly Lord Krishna swaroop.

Present circumstances

The Sachora Brahmin are pure vegetarians, with wheat, maize and millet being their main food source. They have four subdivisions, the Rigvedio Ashwalyami, Shuklayajurvedni Madhyandhini and Siddharkdeoni Shankhayan. They have further eighteen exogamous gotras, the Kaudiniya, Kashyap, Kaushik, Bharadwaj, Parashar, Mudgal, Alembayan, Shatatap, Krishnatreyi Herit, Jyesta Shandiya, Kamishth Shandilya, Gautam, Katayan, Vatsa, Garg, Jyesta Bhargav and Laukash. All these gotras are equal in status and named after Hindu saints. Common surnames of the community include Raval, Shastri, Dave, Joshi, Raman, Bhatt, Vyas, Thakar, Pujarai, Mehta, shukla and Trivedi.

The community is split between those who are small scale farmers and those who maintain their traditional occupation of temple priest.

See also

 Sompura Brahmin

References

Indian castes